RC-20 or Thavalakuppam–Embalam Road branches out from National Highways 45A at Thavalakuppam and ends at Embalam.

It is passing through the following villages:
 Abishegapakkam
 Karikalampakkam

References

External links
 Official website of Public Works Department, Puducherry UT

State highways in Puducherry
Transport in Puducherry